Adam Wiśniowiecki (c. 1566 – 1622) Polish–Lithuanian Commonwealth szlachcic and magnate. Supported False Dmitriy I during the Muscovy Time of Troubles, famous, together with Konstanty Wiśniowiecki (1564-1641), for being the 'finders' of the False Dmitriy I.

Married Aleksandra Chodkiewicz before 1601. Daughter Krystyna Wiśniowiecka born in 1602.

See also
List of szlachta

Bibliography 
А. П. Грыцкевіч. Вішнявецкія // Энцыклапедыя гісторыі Беларусі. У 6 т. Т. 2. Беліцк — Гімн / Беларус. Энцыкл.; Рэдкал.: Б. І. Сачанка (гал. рэд.) і інш.; Маст. Э. Э. Жакевіч. — Мн.: БелЭн, 1994. — 537 с., [8] к.: іл.  

1560s births
1622 deaths
Adam